Roberto Fabrizio (born 19 July 1957) is a former Argentine football player and manager. He coached his club football in Argentina, El Salvador.

External links
http://www.elsalvador.com/deportes/2002/10/2/depor4.shtml
http://www.elsalvador.com/deportes/2002/7/15/depor4.shtml
http://www.ceroacero.es/treinador.php?id=6959&search=1&search_string=roberto+fabrizio

1957 births
Living people
Argentine football managers
Expatriate football managers in El Salvador